Acroneuria internata is a species of stonefly in the family Perlidae. The scientific name of this species was first published 1852 by Walker.

This species is native to the United States.

References

Perlidae
Insects of the United States
Insects described in 1852